Pleurotus ostreatus, the oyster mushroom, oyster fungus, hiratake, or pearl oyster mushroom is a common edible mushroom. It was first cultivated in Germany as a subsistence measure during World War I and is now grown commercially around the world for food. It is related to the similarly cultivated king oyster mushroom. Oyster mushrooms can also be used industrially for mycoremediation purposes.

The oyster mushroom is one of the more commonly sought wild mushrooms, though it can also be cultivated on straw and other media. It has the bittersweet aroma of benzaldehyde (which is also characteristic of bitter almonds).

Name 

Both the Latin and common names refer to the shape of the fruiting body. The Latin pleurotus (side-ear) refers to the sideways growth of the stem with respect to the cap, while the Latin ostreatus (and the English common name, oyster) refers to the shape of the cap which resembles the bivalve of the same name. The reference to oyster may also derive from the slippery texture of the mushroom. The name grey oyster mushroom may  be used for P. ostreatus.

Description

The mushroom has a broad, fan or oyster-shaped cap spanning ; natural specimens range from white to gray or tan to dark-brown; the margin is inrolled when young, and is smooth and often somewhat lobed or wavy. The flesh is white, firm, and varies in thickness due to stipe arrangement. The gills of the mushroom are white to cream, and descend on the stalk if present. If so, the stipe is off-center with a lateral attachment to wood. The spore print of the mushroom is white to lilac-gray, and best viewed on dark background.
The mushroom's stipe is often absent. When present, it is short and thick.

Omphalotus nidiformis is a toxic lookalike found in Australia and Japan. In North America, Omphalotus olivascens, the western jack-o'-lantern mushroom and Clitocybe dealbata, the ivory funnel mushroom, both bear a resemblance to Pleurotus ostreatus. Both Omphalotus olivascens and Clitocybe dealbata contain muscarine and are toxic.

Carnivorous activity
Pleurotus ostreatus is a carnivorous fungus, preying on nematodes by using a calcium-dependent toxin that paralyzes the prey within minutes of contact, causing necrosis and formation of a slurry to facilitate ingestion as a protein-rich food source.

Habitat

The oyster mushroom is widespread in many temperate and subtropical forests throughout the world, although it is absent from the Pacific Northwest of North America, being replaced by P. pulmonarius and P. populinus. It is a saprotroph that acts as a primary decomposer of wood, especially deciduous trees, and beech trees in particular. It is a white-rot wood-decay fungus.

The oyster mushroom is one of the few known carnivorous fungi. Its mycelia can kill and digest nematodes, which is believed to be a way in which the mushroom obtains nitrogen.

The standard oyster mushroom can grow in many places, but some other related species, such as the branched oyster mushroom, grow only on trees. They may be found all year round in the UK.

While this mushroom is often seen growing on dying hardwood trees, it only appears to be acting saprophytically, rather than parasitically. As the tree dies of other causes, P. ostreatus grows on the rapidly increasing mass of dead and dying wood. They actually benefit the forest by decomposing the dead wood, returning vital elements and minerals to the ecosystem in a form usable to other plants and organisms. 
Oyster mushrooms bioaccumulate lithium.

Uses

Culinary 

The oyster mushroom is a choice edible, and is a delicacy in Japanese, Korean and Chinese cuisine. It is frequently served on its own, in soups, stuffed, or in stir-fry recipes with soy sauce. Oyster mushrooms may be used in sauces, such as oyster sauce. The mushroom's taste has been described as mild with a slight odor similar to anise. Oyster mushrooms are used in the Czech and Slovak contemporary cuisine in soups and stews in a similar fashion to meat. The oyster mushroom is best when picked young; as the mushroom ages, the flesh becomes tough and the flavor becomes acrid and unpleasant.

Some toxic Lentinellus species are similar in appearance, but have gills with jagged edges and finely haired caps.

Other uses
The pearl oyster mushroom is also used to create mycelium bricks, mycelium furniture, and leather-like products.

Oyster mushrooms were used to treat soil that had been polluted with diesel oil. The mushroom was able to convert 95% of the oil into non-toxic compounds.  P. ostreatus is also capable of growing upon and degrading oxo-biodegradable plastic bags; it can also contribute to the degradation of  green polyethylene.

Similar species
Similar species include Pleurocybella porrigens, Hohenbuehelia petaloides, and the hairy-capped Phyllotopsis nidulans.

See also
Medicinal fungi
List of Pleurotus species

References

Further reading
Books
 Lincoff, G.H. (1981). National Audubon Society Field Guide to North American Mushrooms. Knopf.  
 Spahr, D.L. (2009). Edible and Medicinal Mushrooms of New England and Eastern Canada. North Atlantic Books.

External links
 
 Video footage of Pleurotus ostreatus
 Mushroom-Collecting.com – Oyster mushrooms

Pleurotaceae
Fungi described in 1774
Fungi of Europe
Fungi in cultivation
Edible fungi
Carnivorous fungi